The Grassatores  are the most diverse infraorder of the Laniatores. It includes over 3,500 species distributed mainly in the tropics They are characterized by the male genitalia without musculature, operated by hydraulic pressure and by the double tarsal claws of posterior legs.

Superfamilies

 Assamioidea Sørensen, 1886
 Phalangodoidea Simon, 1879
 Samooidea Sørensen, 1886
 Zalmoxoidea Sørensen, 1886
 Gonyleptoidea Sundevall, 1833

References

External links
Classification of Opiliones A synoptic taxonomic arrangement of the order Opiliones, down to family-group level, including some photos of the families

Harvestmen